TEDxVienna is an independent TEDx event founded in 2010 by Vlad Gozman, a Viennese entrepreneur. This initiative is independently organized by a group of entrepreneurs, artists, philanthropists, and educators, and incorporated as a non-profit NGO. The curators and organizers of the past events have been led by Gozman and his co-curator Alina Nikolaou according to TED philosophy.

Many of the talks and performances presented at TEDxVienna had international resonance.

Prominent speakers were, for example, Jocelyn Bell Burnell, Adrian Raine, Ron Haviv, Johannes Grenzfurthner of monochrom, Jeffrey Kluger, Jasmin Hagendorfer, Kevin Lieber of Vsauce, Julia Dujmovits, Gurit Birnbaum, 
Leslie Scott.

TEDxVienna is being held annually at the Volkstheater in Vienna, one of the biggest theaters in Austria, which seats over 800 people.

References

External links
 TEDxVienna

Vienna
Culture_in_Vienna
Festivals_in_Vienna
Vienna